Jordan Richards (born 6 July 1997) is an English footballer who plays for National League North side Brackley Town, where he plays as a midfielder.

Playing career

Notts County
Richards began his career with Notts County where his father, Pedro, played over 400 games. Richards gained experience out on loan at Boston United and Irish club Sligo Rovers. During the 2016–17 season, Richards become increasingly involved with the first team squad with County, making 16 appearances in all competitions by the end of the season.

Gainsborough Trinity
In July 2017, Richards signed for National League North side Gainsborough Trinity, despite receiving offers from football league clubs.

King's Lynn Town
On 3 August 2018, Richards signed for Southern League Premier Central side King's Lynn Town.

Career statistics

Personal life
Richards is the son of former Notts County player Pedro Richards.

References

External links

1997 births
Living people
English footballers
English Football League players
Notts County F.C. players
Boston United F.C. players
Sligo Rovers F.C. players
Gainsborough Trinity F.C. players
King's Lynn Town F.C. players
Association football defenders
Association football midfielders